Bravoure ("Bravery") was a 40-gun  of the French Navy.

She was launched in November 1795 in Saint Servan. She took part in the Expédition d'Irlande, and later served in Ganteaume's squadron. On 28 January 1801, she fought an indecisive battle against . In June of the same year, under commander Dordelin, she ferried artillery pieces from Toulon to Elba with Succès; on the way back, she encountered HMS Concorde again in the Tyrrhenian Sea on 10 September 1801, but this time Concorde was accompanied by two other frigates. To avoid capture, she beached herself off Elba and became a total loss.

Sources and references

 

Cocarde-class frigates
Age of Sail frigates of France
1795 ships
Ships built in France
Maritime incidents in 1801
Shipwrecks of Italy
Shipwrecks in the Mediterranean Sea